David Hogg (August 21, 1886 — October 23, 1973) was an American lawyer and politician who served four terms in the United States House of Representatives, representing Indiana from 1925 to 1933 as a Republican.

Early life and education
Hogg was born near Crothersville, Indiana. He graduated from Indiana University College of Liberal Arts in Bloomington in 1909 and from the law department of Indiana University in 1912.

Career
Hogg was admitted to the bar in 1913 and commenced practice in Fort Wayne, Indiana.

Hogg served as Chairman of the Allen County Republican Central Committee from 1922 to 1924, resigning to run for Congress.

In 1924, Hogg was elected as a Republican to the 69th United States Congress, beginning his term on March 4, 1925. Hogg was re-elected to the three subsequent Congresses, finishing his final term on March 3, 1933. The Anti-Saloon League endorsed his candidacy in 1926.

Hogg was an unsuccessful candidate for re-election in 1932 to the 73rd Congress, in 1934 to the 74th Congress, and in 1936 to the 75th Congress.

Following his tenure in Congress, Hogg resumed practicing law, branching out into mutual life insurance in 1939. From 1940 to 1943, he served as President of Goodwill Industries of Fort Wayne.

From 1941 to 1946, Hogg co-published an interdenominational newspaper, after which he again resumed practicing law until his death.

Personal life and death
Outside of politics, Hogg was a member of the Masonic Lodge, the Scottish Rite, the York Rite, and the YMCA. Hogg was also married.

Hogg died at the age of 87 in Fort Wayne on October 23, 1973. He was interred in Lindenwood Cemetery.

References

External links
Official page at the Biographical Directory of the United States Congress
Profile from GovTrack

1886 births
1973 deaths
20th-century American politicians
Republican Party members of the United States House of Representatives from Indiana
People from Jackson County, Indiana
Burials in Indiana